Roman Lob (born 2 July 1990) is a German recording artist. In January and February 2012, Lob was a contestant in the German TV show Unser Star für Baku, produced by the German broadcasting stations Pro7 and Das Erste. He is also the lead singer of the band Rooftop Kingdom, an alternative rock band with origins in Neustadt (Wied). He was also a founding member of German Metalcore band, Days of Despite.

Career

2007–2011: Early beginnings
In 2007, Lob took part in the fourth series of the German Idol format Deutschland sucht den Superstar but had to quit due to a vocal cord infection. He had already advanced into the field of the top 20 contestants.

In 2008, Roman took part in the competition to represent Germany at the Eurovision Song Contest 2008 in Belgrade, as a part of the boy band G12P – Germany 12 Points. The song "When the Boys Come" was ultimately not chosen to compete in the national final.

2012–present: Eurovision Song Contest 2012

On 16 February 2012, he won the show Unser Star für Baku and represented Germany in the Eurovision Song Contest 2012. He achieved eighth place with 110 points in the contest.

Personal life
Along with his sister Lob grew up in Rott, a district of Neustadt (Wied). After high-school diploma, he trained as an industrial mechanic at an auto parts supplier in Troisdorf until January 2011. Lob loves to spend his free time snowboarding and downhill. Because of his love of music he has a microphone tattoo on the chest.

Discography

Albums

Singles

Other charted songs

References

External links
Official Homepage of Roman Lob

Living people
Eurovision Song Contest entrants of 2012
Eurovision Song Contest entrants for Germany
21st-century German male singers
Musicians from Düsseldorf
1990 births